The Worli Fort is a fort in Worli, Mumbai, India. Though often incorrectly assumed to have been built by the Portuguese, the fort was built by the British around 1675 on Worli Hill. Worli Fort overlooked Mahim Bay at a  time when the city comprised just seven islands. The Fort was used as a lookout for enemy ships and pirates. 

The centuries-old village is home to one of the oldest communities of fisherfolk still existing in Mumbai. It was built after the construction of the Bandra-Worli Sea Link.

The area around Worli Hill is also known  for its fossils and interesting geology

See also
List of forts in Maharashtra

References

External links
Worli Fort Satellite image  in Google Maps
Worli Fort on YouTube
Worli Koliwada and Worli Fort on Minor Sights.

Archaeological sites in Maharashtra
History of Mumbai
1675 establishments in the British Empire